was a Japanese rock group that was active between April 2010 and March 2012. The band consisted of five actors, namely Kenta Kamakari (lead vocals), Kei Hosogai (bass), Kosuke Yonehara (drums), Shogo Suzuki (guitar), and Takuya Ide (keyboard and rap).

History

Cocoa Otoko was put together on the romance variety show Ikemen Deru no Hōsoku in 2009. Prior to the group's formation, all of the members were active in entertainment as actors or singers in other groups. They released their debut single, "Amai Wana Nigai Uso...", on April 15, 2010.

The band's name was decided because the members all like  and they are all .

On December 5, 2011, Cocoa Otoko announced that they were disbanding in March 2012, citing interest in other career paths. The group held their final performance on March 31, 2012.

Discography

Studio albums

Extended plays

Singles

DVD
 Heaven's Rock (2010)
 MOTEL ~Hoshigaru Danjo no mote gaku~ DVD box (2011)
 LOG×MEN - COCOA OTOKO. - Digest ver. (2012)

References

External links

Japanese rock music groups